is a Japanese manga series written and illustrated by Kentarō Okamoto. It was serialized in Kodansha's seinen manga magazine Evening from February 2011 to August 2016, with its chapters collected in seven tankōbon volumes. A sequel, titled Sanzoku Diary, began in Evening in December 2016.

Media

Manga
Sanzoku Diary is written and illustrated by Kentarō Okamoto. It was serialized in Kodansha's Evening from February 22, 2011 to August 9, 2016. Kodansha collected its chapters in seven tankōbon volumes, released from December 22, 2011 to October 21, 2016.

A sequel, titled , began in Evening on December 13, 2016. Its latest chapter was released on April 25, 2017.

Volume list

Sanzoku Diary

Sanzoku Diary SS

Original video animation
A 15-minute original video animation (OVA) produced by DLE was bundled with the special edition of the sixth volume of the manga on June 23, 2015.

Reception
Volume 4 reached the 45th place on the weekly Oricon manga chart and, as of December 1, 2013, has sold 39,582 copies; volume 5 also reached the 45th place and, as of August 24, 2014, has sold 21,880 copies.

In 2013, the manga was nominated for the 6th Manga Taishō, receiving 29 points and placing 10th among the eleven nominees. In 2014, it was also nominated for Best General Manga at the 38th Kodansha Manga Awards.

References

External links
 
 

2011 manga
Autobiographical anime and manga
Cooking in anime and manga
Hunting literature
Kodansha manga
Seinen manga